The Halveti Tekke is a Cultural Monument of Albania, located in Berat. The teqe (cemevi in Turkish) was built in 1782 from Ahmet Kurt Pasha and pertained to the Khalwati order, a Sufi sect.

References

Cultural Monuments of Albania
Buildings and structures in Berat
Religious buildings and structures completed in 1782
Ottoman architecture in Albania
Sufi tekkes in Albania
Khalwati order
1782 establishments in the Ottoman Empire